Big St. Martin Island is an island in Mackinac County of the U.S. state of Michigan. It is located in St. Martin Bay, a bay of Lake Huron.

Like other islands in and around the Mackinac Straits, Big St. Martin Island is believed to be sacred ground to local Native Americans.  The island was privately owned as of 2010.

See also
List of islands of Michigan

References

Islands of Lake Huron in Michigan
Islands of Mackinac County, Michigan
Private islands of Michigan
Private islands of the Great Lakes